Government Senior Secondary School Mamring, East Sikkim is a government, co-educational, English medium school situated at Mamring near Pakyong in East district  of Sikkim, India. Established in 1952, the school currently runs from LKG up to Senior Secondary level.

This school is affiliated to Central Board of Secondary Education (CBSE), New Delhi and prepares students for All India Senior School Certificate Examination (AISSCE) and All India Secondary School Examination (AISSE).

References 

High schools and secondary schools in Sikkim
Pakyong district
Educational institutions established in 1952
Central Board of Secondary Education
1952 establishments in Sikkim